This article is part of the history of rail transport by country series

The history of rail transport in Brazil dates back to 1835. In that year, Brazil's first Imperial decree was assigned to authorize a railroad which would connect Rio de Janeiro, Minas Gerais, Bahia, São Paulo and Rio Grande provinces and the main station would be in the Neutral Municipality (Corte) of Rio de Janeiro. Three steam locomotives made in England by William Fairbairn & Sons - which the more famous is the "Baroneza", hauled the trains on this  short line.

Soon afterwards, the line was extended to Raiz da Serra. Thirty years later, the railway company Estrada de Ferro Príncipe do Grão Pará further extended the line up into the mountains as far as Petrópolis. During this period, many railway lines were constructed and put into operation in Brazil by regional train operating companies.

The establishment of a superior, state railway company took place in 1957. On 16 March of that year, Rede Ferroviária Federal, Sociedade Anônima (RFFSA) was founded in a merger of 18 (later 19) individual regional companies.  The RFFSA route network was used for both passenger and freight trains.  Between 1996 and 1998, RFFSA was privatized, and in 2007 it was finally dissolved. During the privatisation and dissolution process, the RFFSA's route network was regionalised and licensed for operation by private companies.

See also

History of Brazil
Rail transport in Brazil
Rio–São Paulo high-speed rail

References

External links

 

pt:Transporte ferroviário no Brasil#História